Occoneechee Speedway was one of the first two NASCAR tracks to open. It closed in 1968 and is the only dirt track remaining from the inaugural 1949 season.

It is located just outside the town of Hillsborough, North Carolina.

Site history

Occoneechee Speedway / Orange Speedway 
The Occoneechee Farm occupied the land in the late 19th century. The farm was named after the Occaneechi Indians that lived in the area in the late 17th century and late 18th century. The landowner, Julian S. Carr, raced horses, and built a half mile horse racing track on the site.

Bill France noticed the horse racing track and expanse of open land while piloting his airplane. On the site of the earlier horse track, he built a 0.9-mile dirt track in September 1947, two months before NASCAR was organized.  In its earliest days, Fonty Flock and his brothers Bob and Tim dominated the track. Louise Smith became NASCAR's first female driver at the track in the fall of 1949. The Occoneechee Speedway hosted stock car racing legends such as Fireball Roberts, Richard Petty, Ned Jarrett and Junior Johnson. It was a crown jewel in NASCAR for most of its existence.

The Sunday racing schedule prompted grassroots opposition in Hillsborough, and the final race at the track, which by that time was called the Orange Speedway, was a Richard Petty victory on September 15, 1968.

The loss of the speedway later made Bill France look for a new spot in the area to build a bigger, better, and faster track with speeds in excess of Daytona International Speedway. Eventually he looked towards South Carolina and eventually Alabama where he built the Talladega Superspeedway which opened a year later where it took Occoneechee Speedway’s date on the schedule.

The Occoneechee/Orange speedway, along with North Wilkesboro Speedway, is one of the inspirations for the dirt track Thomasville Speedway in the Pixar movie Cars 3 in which Petty voices the character Strip Weathers.

Historic Occoneechee Speedway Trail

The Occoneechee Speedway site is now heavily forested with pines and sycamores. The grandstands are still visible, as is much of the mile–long oval track. A walking trail was built in 2003 that crisscrosses the clay track. A non-profit local group, The Historic Speedway Group, continues to organize volunteers to renovate historic structures and maintain the track and trails. The group has collected an impressive archive of videos, photographs, and historical information about the site.

In 2022, the site, owned by the Classical American Homes Preservation Trust, was transferred to state ownership to become part of Eno River State Park.

Winners

Gallery

References

Further reading
Occoneechee-Orange Speedway — Magazine (Speedway Spotlite Publications) by Ed Sanseverino (1994)

External links

The Historic Speedway Group
Kickin' Up Dust At The Orange Speedway
NASCAR track history at racing-reference.info

NASCAR tracks
Motorsport venues in North Carolina
Sports venues on the National Register of Historic Places in North Carolina
Sports venues in Orange County, North Carolina
Companies based in Hillsborough, North Carolina
National Register of Historic Places in Orange County, North Carolina
1947 establishments in North Carolina
Sports venues completed in 1947
1968 disestablishments in North Carolina